Dankler Luis de Jesus Pereira (born 24 January 1992), commonly known as Dankler, is a Brazilian footballer who plays as a central defender.

Club career

Botafogo
Dankler joined Botafogo in 2012 from Vitória. He made his Série A debut for Botafogo on 5 October 2013 against Grêmio Foot-Ball Porto Alegrense playing the full game in a 0–1 home defeat.

On 20 April 2015, Dankler joined Joinville on loan until the end of the 2015 season.

Estoril
In January 2016, moved to Portuguese Primeira Liga club Estoril as a free agent signing for three and a half seasons.

Vissel Kobe
After six months with Vitória Setúbal, he moved to Vissel Kobe in February 2019.

Honours
Vissel Kobe
Emperor's Cup: 2019
Japanese Super Cup: 2020

References

External links

Living people
1992 births
Brazilian footballers
Campeonato Brasileiro Série A players
Ligue 2 players
J1 League players
Saudi Professional League players
Esporte Clube Vitória players
Botafogo de Futebol e Regatas players
Joinville Esporte Clube players
G.D. Estoril Praia players
RC Lens players
Vitória F.C. players
Vissel Kobe players
Cerezo Osaka players
Al-Ahli Saudi FC players
Association football defenders
Expatriate footballers in Portugal
Expatriate footballers in France
Expatriate footballers in Japan
Expatriate footballers in Saudi Arabia
Brazilian expatriate sportspeople in Portugal
Brazilian expatriate sportspeople in France
Brazilian expatriate sportspeople in Japan
Brazilian expatriate sportspeople in Saudi Arabia
Footballers from São Paulo